Proliga is the Indonesian professional top level competition for volleyball clubs. It is organised by Persatuan Bola Voli Seluruh Indonesia (PBVSI) or Indonesian Volleyball Association.

Teams

Current teams (2023 season)

Honours

Titles by clubs

See also
Indonesian women's Proliga

References

External links
 Official Site
 Volimania Indonesia

Volleyball
Indonesia
Volleyball in Indonesia
Sports leagues established in 2002
2002 establishments in Indonesia
Professional sports leagues in Indonesia